Nikita Vyacheslavovich Bedrin (born 6 January 2006) is a Russian racing driver who is racing under an Italian racing license. He currently competes in the 2023 FIA Formula 3 Championship with Jenzer Motorsport. During pre-season early in 2023, Bedrin competed in the Formula Regional Middle East Championship with PHM Racing.

Career

Karting 
Having started out his karting career in his homeland, Bedrin won the Russian Karting Championship twice before moving to Italy to compete on the more competitive European stage. His karting career proved to be a success, with him winning the Italian Championship in 2019 and the WSK Super Master Series in his final year of karting, 2020, as well as finishing fourth in the European Championship during the same year.

Lower formulae

2021 

Bedrin graduated to cars in 2021, racing in the Formula 4 UAE Championship with Xcel Motorsport. He scored his first podium in the second round, taking third in race three, but would sustain a hand injury during the following round which would end his campaign prematurely.

The Russian's main campaign would be in the Italian and ADAC F4 series, partnering Ollie Bearman, Joshua Dufek, Bence Válint and Han Cenyu at Van Amersfoort Racing. He would score points regularly in Italy, with the season highlight being a triple of podiums at Imola Circuit, where Bedrin was awarded the Race 3 victory after a disqualification for Bearman due to a technical infringement. Over in Germany, the Russian took two wins, one at Hockenheim and the Nürburgring respectively, which elevated him up to fifth overall. His frequent points finishes and flurry of podiums also brought him the rookie title in both championships.

2022 
The following year, Bedrin returned to the category, starting his season in the F4 UAE Championship, where he drove alongside Taylor Barnard and Jonas Ried for new team PHM Racing. His campaign proved to be a success, as he took two wins, one a piece in Dubai and Abu Dhabi, which led the Russian on to finish fourth in the standings.

Bedrin would follow that up by returning to the Italian F4 and ADAC F4 series, once again driving for PHM. In the former, Bedrin took a pair of podiums but was hampered by an inconsistent end to the season, leaving him twelfth in the championship. Meanwhile, his season in ADAC Formula 4 would bear more fruit, as he finished fourth overall, with six podiums, including a lone win at a rainy Lausitzring, under his belt.

2023 
At the start of 2023, Bedrin is set to compete in the 2023 Formula Regional Middle East Championship with PHM Racing.

FIA Formula 3 
In September 2022, Bedrin took part in the FIA Formula 3 post-season test for Jenzer Motorsport together with his PHM teammate Taylor Barnard and Euroformula Open driver Alex García. He would subsequently be signed up for the 2023 F3 season, driving for Jenzer Motorsport. He is due to compete as Italian after the FIA banned drivers from competing under the Russian flag following the 2022 Russian invasion of Ukraine.

Karting record

Karting career summary

Complete CIK-FIA Karting European Championship results 
(key) (Races in bold indicate pole position) (Races in italics indicate fastest lap)

Complete Karting World Championship results

Racing record

Racing career summary 

* Season still in progress.

Complete F4 UAE Championship results 
(key) (Races in bold indicate pole position) (Races in italics indicate fastest lap)

Complete Italian F4 Championship results 
(key) (Races in bold indicate pole position) (Races in italics indicate fastest lap)

Complete ADAC Formula 4 Championship results 
(key) (Races in bold indicate pole position) (Races in italics indicate fastest lap)

Complete Formula Regional Middle East Championship results
(key) (Races in bold indicate pole position) (Races in italics indicate fastest lap)

Complete FIA Formula 3 Championship results 
(key) (Races in bold indicate pole position) (Races in italics indicate fastest lap)

References

External links 

 

Living people
2006 births
Russian racing drivers
People from Belgorod
Russian expatriate sportspeople in Italy
Karting World Championship drivers
UAE F4 Championship drivers
Italian F4 Championship drivers
ADAC Formula 4 drivers
Formula Regional Middle East Championship drivers
Van Amersfoort Racing drivers
PHM Racing drivers
FIA Formula 3 Championship drivers
Jenzer Motorsport drivers